A kytoon or kite balloon is a tethered aircraft which obtains some of its lift dynamically as a heavier-than-air kite and the rest aerostatically as a lighter-than-air balloon. The word is a portmanteau of kite and balloon.

The primary advantage of a kytoon is that it remains in a reasonably stable position above the tether point, irrespective of the strength of wind, whereas ordinary balloons and kites are less stable.

The kytoon has been used for many purposes both civil and military.

History
In 1919, a handbook was published giving extensive details to support the kite balloon crafts being used in the military. Described is the first kite balloon made in 1893 by Captains Parseval and Sigsfeld at the Berlin works of the Prussian Balloon Battalion; theirs was the "predecessor of the Drachen balloon." "This was the first real kite balloon flying like a kite with a fairly constant angle and direction relative to the wind and remained practically unchanged until the beginning of the war in 1914-1918."
A hybrid kite-balloon was patented by Domina Jalbert in 1944 as patent US2431938 and later became known as the kytoon. Jalbert furthered his attention on kite balloons also with another patent filed on August 31, 1945 titled "Kite Balloon"

The Allsopp Helikite is a modern helium-filled example.

Stability
A captive balloon tends to drift down the wind and the harder the wind blows, the further the balloon drifts. This leans the tether over at an angle, pulling the balloon lower. On a kytoon, the kite action lifts the balloon, counteracting this pull and holding the kytoon in position. As the wind blows harder, the kite action lifts harder. This can provide good stability even in strong winds.

In low or gusty winds a kite can nose-dive, losing a large amount of height even if it recovers. Because a kytoon is buoyant it does not nose-dive and remains in position even in relatively still air.

Applications 

Applications of the kytoon have included:

 Raise communications antenna aloft
 Commercial advertising
 Low-level aerial photography
 Raise wind turbines for generating electricity
 Raise emergency signals in calm or wind
 Meteorological measurements
 Sighting target for conducting geographical surveys
 Scare birds away from crops
 Recreation

See also
Aerostat
Airship
Buoyancy
Kite types
Rotor kite
Tethered balloon

References

External links
Helikites
Air-Foil Aerostat

Balloons (aeronautics)
Ballooning
Hydrogen technologies
Kites